Jan Cornelis van Gooswilligen (12 July 1935 – 19 December 2008) was a hockey player from the Netherlands.

International career 
He competed  at the 1960 and 1964 Summer Olympics, where his team finished in ninth and seventh place, respectively. Between 1958 and 1964 he played 58 international matches, 38 of them as the team captain.

Van Gooswilligen was selected for the national team in 1958. Next year, he and three other players left the team in protest of unfair selection processes; as a result a new group of selectors was appointed. The same year he won a national title with his club SCHC.

Retirement and Philanthropy 
After retiring from hockey, van Gooswilligen became a urologist and occasionally competed in cycling at the national level.

Together with his wife  Ammy, he founded an advisory center for sports medicine.

References

External links
 

1935 births
2008 deaths
Dutch male field hockey players
Field hockey players at the 1960 Summer Olympics
Field hockey players at the 1964 Summer Olympics
Olympic field hockey players of the Netherlands
People from Baarn
Dutch urologists
Dutch sports physicians
Sportspeople from Utrecht (province)
20th-century Dutch people